Nterato, or Ntrapo (ntrapʊ), is a nearly extinct Guang language of Ghana.

References

Guang languages
Endangered Niger–Congo languages
Languages of Ghana